NGC 6509 is a galaxy in the New General Catalogue. It is located in the constellation Ophiuchus. It is a Sc type spiral galaxy.

References 

6509
Ophiuchus (constellation)